Youssou Ndoye (born July 15, 1991) is a Senegalese professional basketball player for Covirán Granada of the Spanish Liga ACB. He played college basketball for the St. Bonaventure Bonnies.

High school career
Ndoye played high school basketball at Lee Academy in Lee, Maine for two years. After averaging seven points, seven rebounds and two blocks per game, he was rated among the top centers of his class heading into college.

College career
As a senior at St. Bonaventure, Ndoye averaged 11.8 points, 10.1 rebounds and 2.6 blocks, earning a mention to the Atlantic 10 All-Defensive Team and a third-team All-Atlantic 10 mention.

Professional career

Austin Spurs (2015—2016)
After going undrafted in the 2015 NBA draft, Ndoye joined the San Antonio Spurs for the 2015 NBA Summer League where he averaged 3.2 and 1.8 rebounds in six games. On September 28, 2015, Ndoye signed with the Spurs, only to be waived by the team on October 21 after appearing in three preseason games. Nine days later, he was acquired by the Austin Spurs of the NBA Development League as an affiliate player of San Antonio.

JL Bourg (2016–2019)
After rejoining San Antonio in the 2016 NBA Summer League, Ndoye signed on September 5, 2016 with JL Bourg-en-Bresse of the French LNB Pro B.

Nanterre 92 (2019–2020)
On August 18, 2019, he has signed with Nanterre 92 of the LNB Pro A.

Coosur Real Betis (2020–2021)
On June 24, 2020, he has signed with Real Betis of the Liga ACB.

Orléans Loiret Basket (2021–2022)
On August 17, 2021, he has signed with Orléans Loiret Basket of the LNB Pro A.

Daegu KOGAS Pegasus (2022–2023)
On July 24, 2022, he signed with Daegu KOGAS Pegasus of the Korean Basketball League.

Covirán Granada (2023–present)
On January 7, 2023, he signed with Covirán Granada of the Spanish Liga ACB.

Personal life
Ndoye, the son of Penda and Ibrahima, has an older brother, Mohammed, and two older sisters, Khadija and Maguette. His mother played on the Senegal national basketball team and introduced him to the game. He minored in French history.

References

External links
NBADraft.net profile

1991 births
Living people
2019 FIBA Basketball World Cup players
Austin Spurs players
Centers (basketball)
Daegu KOGAS Pegasus players
Expatriate basketball people in South Korea
JL Bourg-en-Bresse players
Lee Academy (Maine) alumni
Liga ACB players
Nanterre 92 players
Orléans Loiret Basket players
Real Betis Baloncesto players
Senegalese expatriate basketball people in France
Senegalese expatriate basketball people in the United States
Senegalese men's basketball players
St. Bonaventure Bonnies men's basketball players